Aphanotorulus unicolor is a species of catfish in the family Loricariidae. It is native to South America, where it occurs in the upper Amazon River basin. The species reaches 13.9 cm (5.5 inches) SL.

A. unicolor was originally described as Plecostomus unicolor by Franz Steindachner in 1908. It was subsequently listed as a member of Aphanotorulus by I. J. H. Isbrücker, I. Seidel, J. Michels, E. Schraml, and A. Werner in 2001. In 2004, Jonathan W. Armbruster classified the species within Hypostomus instead of Aphanotorulus. In 2016, following a review of Isorineloricaria and Aphanotorulus by C. Keith Ray and Armbruster (both of Auburn University), the species was transferred once again to Aphanotorulus.

References 

Fish described in 1908
Loricariidae